Tear gas is a non-lethal chemical weapon that cause severe eye and respiratory pain, skin irritation, bleeding, and blindness.

Tear gas may also refer to:

 Teargas (group), a South African musical trio
 Teargas (EP), 2000 EP by Katatonia 
 Tear Gas (album), 2009 studio album by The Jacka 
 Tear Gas Squad, 1940 American film